Mełchów  is a village in the administrative district of Gmina Lelów, within Częstochowa County, Silesian Voivodeship, in southern Poland.

The village has a population of 105.

During the January Uprising, on September 30, 1863 near the village the Battle of Mełchów was fought, in which Polish insurgents supported by Hungarian volunteers defeated Russian troops.

References

Villages in Częstochowa County